The discography of Japanese musician Miwa consists of six studio albums, one compilation album, seven video albums and twenty-five singles. After releasing two independent singles, Miwa debuted through major label Sony Music Entertainment Japan with the single "Don't Cry Anymore" (2010), a song used as the theme song of the drama Nakanai to Kimeta Hi. The song was commercially successful, and was eventually certified Platinum by the Recording Industry Association of Japan. This song, along with her third single "Change", used as a theme song for the anime Bleach, led her debut album Guitarissimo (2011) to debut at number one on Oricon's album charts.

Miwa's most commercially successful song is "Hikari e" (2012), used as the theme song for the Shun Oguri drama Rich Man, Poor Woman, which was certified Million for digital downloads.

Studio albums

Compilation albums

Singles

As a lead artist

As a featured artist

Promotional singles

Other charted songs

Video albums

Notes

References

Discographies of Japanese artists
Pop music discographies